Archinus was a historian of ancient Greece, who lived at an uncertain date, and who wrote a work on the history of Thessaly. This book, however, is now lost.

Notes

Ancient Greek historians
Ancient Greek writers known only from secondary sources